Paragiopagurus wallisi is a species of hermit crab in the family Parapaguridae. It lives in the Eastern Pacific, in areas like the French Polynesia, Sala y Gómez, and the Nazca Ridges in benthic environments from 200 to 300 meters deep.

References

Crustaceans described in 1994
Crustaceans of the eastern Pacific Ocean